Mervyn "Merv" Dihm (born 16 September 1933) is a former Australian rules footballer who played with St Kilda in the Victorian Football League (VFL).

While serving at naval air station  as a naval rating in 1953, Dihm was arrested and charged with assault. It was alleged that he assaulted a navy personnel's wife with a block of wood, after breaking into her room. He pleaded guilty and argued that he had been under the influence of benzedrine and couldn't remember the incident. The court found him guilty and he served a short jail sentence.

Dihm played just eight games for St Kilda, all in the 1955 VFL season, but made a name for himself in Queensland football. He was the joint winner of the 1960 Grogan Medal, while playing with Morningside.

References

1933 births
Australian rules footballers from Victoria (Australia)
St Kilda Football Club players
Morningside Australian Football Club players
South Sydney Football Club players
Criminals from New South Wales
Living people